In the theory of quantum communication, an amplitude damping channel is a quantum channel that models physical processes such as spontaneous emission. A natural process by which this channel can occur is a spin chain through which a number of spin states, coupled by a  time independent Hamiltonian, can be used to send a quantum state from one location to another. The resulting quantum channel ends up being identical to an amplitude damping channel, for which the quantum capacity, the classical capacity and the entanglement assisted classical capacity of the quantum channel can be evaluated.

Qubit Channel
The amplitude damping channel is defined by:
 Coupling the input qubit to another qubit in the |0⟩ state.
 Performing the unitary action ,  .
 Tracing out the extra qubit.

The amplitude-damping channel models energy relaxation from an excited state to the ground state.  On a two-dimensional system, or qubit, with decay probability , the channel's action on a density matrix  is given by 

where  are the Kraus operators given by 

Thus

Model for a Spin Chain Quantum Channel
The main construct of the quantum channel based on spin chain correlations is to have a collection of N coupled spins. At either side of the quantum channel, there are two groups of spins and we refer to these as quantum registers, A and B.  A message is sent by having the sender of the message encode some information on register A, and then, after letting it propagate over some time t, having the receiver later retrieve it from B. The state  is prepared on A by first decoupling the spins on A from those on the remainder of the chain. After preparation,  is allowed to interact with the state on the remainder of the chain, which initially has the state . From this relationship we can obtain the state of the spins belonging to register B by tracing away all other states of the chain. 
 

This gives the mapping below, which describes how the state on A is transformed as a function of time as it is transmitted over the quantum channel to B. U(t) is just some unitary matrix which describes the evolution of the system as a function of time.

There are, however, a few issues with this description of the quantum channel. One of the assumptions involved with using such a channel is that we expect that the states of the chain are not disturbed. While it may be possible for a state to be encoded on A without disturbing the chain, a reading of the state from B will influence the states of the rest of the spin chain.  Thus, any repeated manipulation of the registers A and B will have an unknown impact on the quantum channel. Given this fact, solving the capacities of this mapping would not be generally useful, since it will only apply when several copies of the chain are operating in parallel.  In order to calculate meaningful values for these capacities, the simple model below allows for the capacities to be solved exactly.

Solvable Model

A spin chain, which is composed of a chain of particles with spin 1/2 coupled through a ferromagnetic Heisenberg interaction, is used, and is described by the Hamiltonian:

It is assumed that the input register, A and the output register B occupy the first k and last k spins along the chain, and that all spins along the chain are prepared to be in the spin down state in the z direction.  The  parties then use all k of their spin states to encode/decode a single qubit. The motivation for this method is that if all k spins were allowed to be used, we would have a k-qubit channel, which would be too complex to be completely analyzed.  Clearly, a more effective channel would make use of all k spins, but by using this inefficient method, it is possible to look at the resulting maps analytically.

To carry out the encoding of a single bit using the k available bits, a one-spin up vector is defined , in which all spins are in the spin down state except for the j-th one, which is in the spin up state.

The sender prepares his set of k input spins as:

Using this input, it is possible to find a state which describes the whole chain at a given time t. From such a state, tracing out the N-k spins not belonging to the receiver, as we would have done with the earlier model, leaves the state on B:

where  is a constant defining the efficiency of the channel.  If we represent the states in which one spin is up to be  and those where all spins are down to be ,  this becomes recognizable as the result of applying the amplitude damping channel , characterized by the following Kraus operators:

;

 
Evidently, the fact that an amplitude damping channel describes the transmission of quantum states across the spin chain stems from the fact that Hamiltonian of the system conserves energy. While energy can be spread out as the one-spin up state is transferred along the chain, it is not possible for spins in the down state to suddenly gain energy and become spin up states.

Capacities of the Amplitude Damping Channel 

By describing the spin-chain as an amplitude damping channel, it is possible to calculate the various capacities associated with the channel. One useful property of this channel, which is used to find these capacities, is the fact that two amplitude damping channels with efficiencies  and  can be concatenated. Such a concatenation gives a new channel of efficiency .

Quantum Capacity

In order to calculate the quantum capacity, the map  is represented as follows:

Using this operation, as well as the rule for concatenation of amplitude damping channels, it is shown that for :

This relationship demonstrates that the channel is degradable, which guarantees that the coherent information of the channel is additive. This implies that the quantum capacity is achieved for a single channel use.

An amplitude damping mapping is applied to a general input state, and from this mapping, the von Neumann entropy of the output is found as:

By looking at a purification of the state, it is found that:

In order to maximize the quantum capacity, we choose that  (due to concavity of entropy, which yields the following as the quantum capacity:

Entanglement Assisted Classical Capacity

To calculate the entanglement assisted capacity we must maximize the quantum mutual information. This is found by adding the input entropy of the message to the derived coherent information in the previous section. Thus, the entanglement assisted classical capacity is found to be

Classical Capacity

We now calculate C1, which is the maximum amount of classical information that can be transmitted by non-entangled encodings over parallel channel uses. This quantity acts as a lower bound for the classical capacity, C. To find C1, the classical capacity is maximized for n=1. We consider an ensemble of messages, each with probability . The Holevo information is found to be:

As before,  is set to be 0 in order to maximize the first term of Holevo information.

By maximizing over all choices of p, the following upper bound for C1 is found:

Numerical Analysis of the Capacities

From the expressions for the various capacities, it is possible to carry out a numerical analysis on them. When  is less than 0.5, too much information is lost to the environment for quantum information to be sent to the receiving party.

Effectiveness of Spin-Chains as a Quantum Communication Channel

Having calculated the capacities for the amplitude damping channel as a function of the efficiency of the channel, it is possible to analyze the effectiveness of such a channel as a function of distance between the encoding site and the decoding site. Due to the fact that the quantum capacity vanishes for  less than 0.5, this means that the distance between the sender and the receiver must be very short in order for any quantum information to be transmitted. Therefore, long spin chains are not suitable to transmit quantum information.

Future Study

Possibilities for future study in this field would include methods whereby spin-chain interactions could be used as a more effective channel. Such an optimization could allow for more effective transmission of quantum data over distance. An alternative to this would be to split the chain into smaller segments, and to use a large number of spin chains to transmit quantum data. This would be effective since the spin chains are themselves good at transmitting quantum data short distances. On top of this, it would be possible to increase the quantum capacity by allowing for free two way classical communication between the sender and receiver and making use of quantum effects such as quantum teleportation. Other areas of study would include an analysis for an encoding that makes use of the full k spins of the registers, as this would allow for more information to be communicated at a time.

External links 

Michael A. Nielsen, Isaac L. Chuang, "Quantum Computation and Quantum Information"

Quantum information science